Tytthoscincus bukitensis, also known as the Fraser's Hill forest skink , is a species of skink. It is endemic to Peninsular Malaysia.

Adult females measure  in snout–vent length.

References

bukitensis
Endemic fauna of Malaysia
Reptiles of Malaysia
Reptiles described in 2007
Taxa named by Larry Lee Grismer